Quality control is a process for maintaining proper standards in manufacturing.

Quality control may also refer to:
 Analytical quality control
 Quality Control (album), a 2000 album by Jurassic 5
 "Quality Control", title track from the above
 Quality Control Music, an American record label
 Quality Control: Control the Streets Volume 1, a compilation album by Quality Control Music
 A song from Summer Girl, the fifth LP from Smash Mouth